Sukhpur is a village in North Bihar. Sukhpur is endowed with fertile alluvial soil as it lie in the plain of koshi. Climate of village is mild and monsoon type. Summer is not so hot as compared to northern India mainly due to its proximity to the eastern Himalayas but temperature goes down to as cold as 8C during Winter.  Rain is mainly concentrated from May to September.  The village receives plenty of rain (more than 250 cm per year).  Sukhpur is also flood prone due to shifting nature of River Koshi however till now the village has not yet taste the flood water except for its outskirt. Sukhpur is well organized in the sense that the region residing for living & agriculture is separated from each other.

Most of the villagers are engaged in cultivation. On an average three crops are taken per year from a same piece of land. Major crops include rice, wheat mung, and corn. Mango and Litchi are also major horticulture crops. Mango is major contribution to the farmers income.
Three of major land portion namely "Lalbagh"  "Kalibagh" & "Mamabagh" is occupied by mango trees yielding huge amounts of mangoes.

Castes and to some extent untouchables are still prevalent in the village. The morphology of village is semi-clustered. The main religions observed by villagers are Hinduism and Islam with the Hindu population further divided into many castes and creeds. There is segregation based on the caste system and each segment of the village is known by tola such as Dayodhi(Royal Rajputana ), Bhadarpatti (Yadav), Gauripur(Brahman) & some of the region of Purabia Tola where Rajputs and Maithil Brahman reside, mushari where dalit lives.

Sukhpur is linked to Supaul, and Saharsa town of the region by road. Neighboring villages are Parsarma, Parsoni, Bero, Malhni, Balha, Solhni, Karanpur and Nawhatta.

The education system of Sukhpur is much contributing for many villages since it has 6 schools namely "High School, Sukhpur", "Chetmani Middle school, Sukhpur", "Prathmic School, Sukhpur", "Harijan School", "Sanskrit Madhya Vidyalaya" & "Primary Girls School".  Sukhpur high school has been the flag bearer for education in the region.. providing quality school education not only to Sukhpur but all its surrounding villages.  Apart from the education the high school has got a very beautiful play ground, providing the villagers to engage in sports mainly Cricket, football, volleyball. Land for construction of all these schools is donated by family member of Sukhpur Dayodhi villagers and as Babu Chetmani Singh was elder son of that family the School name was given on his name i.e. High School, Chetmani Middle School, Primary School, Girls Primary School including playground of High school, Sukhpur. People of Sukhpur Dayodhi contributed a lot for sukhpur village .
"Tilheshwar", temple of lord Shiva is the most famous place of this village.  So many visitors come to this place.  Visitors like to visit this temple in "Saawan".  This place is very peaceful and bounded by natural scenery.  Durgapuja is the most import festival where grand melaa is organised in the village.
There is a temple called Mahavir ≤Mandir in Pubaria tola where every Tuesday Villagers organize kirtan and bhajan and also indulge in Ramayan pooja. People sit and pray and take Aarti at around 11 to 11:30 pm. As per villagers this temple is constructed by donations and contribution from people of Pubaria tola.

Villages in Supaul district